Joe Skipper (born 25 March 1988) is an English professional triathlete and ITU Long Distance Triathlon World Championships bronze medalist.

Skipper won his first World Championships medal at the ITU Long Distance Triathlon World Championships in 2015, held in Motala, Sweden where he finished in third position, claiming the bronze.

As of 2015, Skipper hold the 3rd fastest Ironman bike split of all time. He is also the fastest British male ironman of all time. Skipper won silver at Ironman Texas in May 2015, breaking the course record for the cycle stage.

Achievements

References 

1988 births
Living people
English male triathletes